Shakil Ahmed may refer to:

 Shakil Ahmed (general) (died 2009), Bangladeshi Army personnel
 Shakil Ahmed (footballer, born 1988), Bangladeshi national footballer
 Shakil Ahmed (footballer, born 1994), Bangladeshi footballer
 Shakil Ahmed (sport shooter), Bangladeshi sport shooter
 Shakil Ahmed (cricketer), Pakistani Test cricketer

See also
 Shakeel Ahmed (disambiguation)